Montfort-sur-Risle (literally Montfort on Risle) is a commune in the Eure department in Normandy region in northern France.

History

In Gallic times the river Risle delimited the territories of the tribes of Veliocasses and the Lexovii. Between 980 and 1204, when it passed into the hands of the King of France with its castle, Montfort-sur-Risle was a lordship. The most famous Lord of Montfort was Hugues II de Montfort (died 1083), who joined in the Norman conquest of England, for which he received 114 English manors.

Population

See also

Communes of the Eure department

References

 	

Communes of Eure